Gregory VI of Cilicia (also Gregory VI Apiratsi or Grigor VI Apirat) was the Catholicos of the Armenian Church from 1194 to 1203, located in Sis. In 1198, he proclaimed a union between Rome and the Armenian Church.

Gregory VI was a nephew of Gregory III of Cilicia and Nerses IV the Gracious. He was favorable to the Latins and had been nominated by Prince Levon I of Armenia (the future King Levon I), because of the need of an alliance. This election created a schism in the Armenian Church however, and a rival anti-patriarch was elected in Greater Armenia.

Gregory's announcement of union was not followed in deeds however, as the local clergy and populace was strongly opposed to it.

When Levon, Lord of Cilicia, asked to the Pope and to the Emperor that he be recognized as king, the condition was that the Armenian Church should join the Roman rite. He formally accepted the union, but this again was without effect as the Armenian clergy was strongly opposed to it, and never accepted the doctrine of the double nature of Christ. Gregory VI crowned him King of Armenia in 1198/1199 and the Cilician Armenian kingdom began.

References
René Grousset, L'Empire du Levant : Histoire de la Question d'Orient, 1949

Catholicoi of Cilicia
Armenian Oriental Orthodox Christians
Pahlavuni family
13th-century Oriental Orthodox archbishops
12th-century Oriental Orthodox archbishops